The 1905 TCU football team represented Texas Christian University (TCU) as an independent during the 1905 college football season. Led by first-year head coach, Emory J. Hyde, TCU compiled a record of 4–4. The team's captain was H. H. Knight.

Schedule

References

TCU
TCU Horned Frogs football seasons
TCU football